Eco-innovation is the development of products and processes that contribute to sustainable development, applying the commercial application of knowledge to elicit direct or indirect ecological improvements. This includes a range of related ideas, from environmentally friendly technological advances to socially acceptable innovative paths towards sustainability. The field of research that seeks to explain how, why, and at what rate new "ecological" ideas and technology spread is called eco-innovation diffusion.

Concept

The idea of eco-innovation is fairly recent. One of the first appearances in the literature was in a book by Claude Fussler and Peter James. In a subsequent article, Peter James defined eco-innovation as "new products and processes which provide customer and business value but significantly decrease environmental impacts". Klaus Rennings employs the term eco-innovation to describe three kinds of changes related to sustainable development: technological, social and institutional innovation.

Eco-innovation is sometimes called "environmental innovation", and is often linked with environmental technology, eco-efficiency, eco-design, environmental design, sustainable design, or sustainable innovation. While the term "environmental innovation" is used in similar contexts to "eco-innovation", the other terms are mostly used when referring to product or process design, and when the focus is more on the technological aspects of eco-innovation rather than the societal and political aspects. Ecovation is the process by which business adopts ecological innovation to create products which have a generative nature and are recyclable.

As a technological term

The most common usage of the term "eco-innovation" is to refer to innovative products and processes that reduce environmental impacts, whether the main motivation for their development or deployment is environmental or not. This is often used in conjunction with eco-efficiency and eco-design. Leaders in many industries have been developing innovative technologies in order to work towards sustainability. However, these are not always practical, or enforced by policy and legislation.

As a social process

Another position held (for example, by the organisation Eco Innovation) is that this definition should be complemented: eco-innovations should also bring greater social and cultural acceptance. In this view, this "social pillar" added to James's definition is necessary because it determines learning and the effectiveness of eco-innovations. This approach gives eco-innovations a social component, a status that is more than a new type of commodity, or a new sector, even though environmental technology and eco-innovation are associated with the emergence of new economic activities or even branches (e.g., waste treatment, recycling, etc.). This approach considers eco-innovation in terms of usage rather than merely in terms of product. The social pillar associated with eco-innovation introduces a governance component that makes eco-innovation a more integrated tool for sustainable development.

Examples
 Geothermal power – utitialised through technology such as dry steam power stations, flash steam power stations and binary cycle power stations.
 Hydropower – utitialised through technology such as hydroelectric dams.
 Solar power – utitialised through technology such as solar panels.
 Tidal power – utitialised through technology such as tidal barrages and tidal stream generators.
 Wind power – utitialised through technology such as wind turbines.

Diffusion 
Literature in the field of eco-innovations often focuses on policy, regulations, technology, market and firm specific factors rather than diffusion. However, understanding of diffusion of eco-innovations recently has gained more importance given the fact that some eco-innovations are already at a mature stage. Survey research shows that most customers hold positive attitudes towards various types of eco-innovations. At the same time, adoption rates of solutions such as dynamic electricity tariffs remain unsatisfactorily low. The "Not In My Back Yard" (NIMBY) concept is often used to describe what at first seems to be a confusing intention-behavior gap between high levels of public support for eco-innovations and frequent non-engagement or even local hostility towards specific project proposals. Social psychology and economic behavior models could and should be used to overcome these challenges. According to theory on the diffusion on innovation different adopters of innovation can be in different stages of acceptance. Research on eco-innovations in the construction sector reveals that for eco-innovations to gain acceptance among B2B actors, in addition to having a reduced environmental footprint, they need to demonstrate improved efficiency, create new market opportunities, and help to change the mindset from the traditional mass production to that of creating value. Hence, for such innovations to diffuse in a larger market they need to address industry-specific problems, and not simply act as a substitute for an existing technology.

See also
Eco-development
Ecological design
Ecological restoration
Ecomodernism
Environmental technology
Frugal innovation
International Innovation Index
Sustainable agriculture
Sustainopreneurship

References

External links
Eco-innovation: Potentials and challenges of tomorrow's technologies (conference held in Copenhagen 2005)
Environmental technologies Action Plan (ETAP) A European Commission initiative:
 What is ecoinnovation? (EnviroWindows-European Environment Agency).
 European Funding programme for SMEs who want to put an Eco-Innovation on the European market

Bright green environmentalism
Design
Innovation economics
Innovation
Product management
Product development
Science and technology studies
Sustainable technologies